Ghabdellatif (Abdul Latyf, Abd al Latif; Tatar: Ğäbdellatíf ) or Abdullatif (ca. 1475 – after 1502) was the khan of Kazan Khanate from 1496-1502.

Ghabdellatif was the youngest son of Ibrahim of Kazan and Nur Soltan. When Ghabdellatif's father died in 1479, his mother married Meñli I Giray and relocated to the Crimean Khanate. Around 1490 Meñli I Giray sent Ghabdellatif to Muscovy for service, where he received the town of Zvenigorod, while his brother Moxammat Amin ruled Kashira. This was considered a great honor because these towns were usually given to the sons of the Grand Duke of Muscovy.

After a 1495 coup against the pro-Muscovy Moxammat Amin, the khan Mamuq quickly discredited himself. Ghabdellatif was chosen as a weaker alternative to his brother Moxammat Amin with Moscow's approval.

In 1499 another attempt was made to restore the Siberian dynasty to the throne of Kazan. Uraq attempted to establish Agalaq as Kazan khan, but the attempt was repelled.

Ghabdellatif grew up in the Crimean Khanate, which had closer ties with the Ottoman Empire than with Muscovy. As he became older, he started to conduct more independent politics, which was unacceptable to the faction which selected him for the throne. In 1501 a group of Kazan nobles headed by Qol (Kel) Axmat visited Moscow and in January 1502, an embassy from Muscovy came to Kazan. Ghabdellatif was ousted, taken from Kazan under guard to Moscow and then exiled to Beloozero (now Belozersk, Russia). Moxammat Amin was installed as khan once again. The conflict resulted in a number of inquiries from the Crimean Khanate but did not lead to hostilities, perhaps because the throne passed to another step son of Meñli I Giray and because the Crimean Khanate was busy with a war against the Golden Horde.

It's possible that Ghabdellatif lived in exile at least until 1511, when he was visited by his mother.

References

Bibliography

See also
 List of Kazan khans

1470s births
1500s deaths
Khanate of Kazan
15th-century monarchs in Europe
16th-century monarchs in Europe